The Apotactics or Apotactites (from the Greek apotassomai, to renounce) were adherents of a Christian heresy which sprang up in the third century and spread through the western and southern parts of Asia Minor (present Anatolia, Asian Turkey).

History
What little is known of this sect is found in the writings of Epiphanius of Salamis, who wrote that they called themselves Apotactics ("renunciators") because they scrupulously renounced all private property, believing that "a renunciation of property is necessary to salvation." They were also called Apostolics, because they attempted to follow the manner of life of the Twelve Apostles, and they rejected marriage. They also  abstained from wine and meat. The saint regards them as a branch of the Tatians, akin to the Encratites and the Cathari. Further, according to Epiphanius, "They boast of having no possessions, if you please, but they divide and harm God's holy church for no good reason, by depriving themselves of God's lovingkindness through their willful sort of worship. For they allow no readmission if one of them has lapsed, and when it comes to matrimony and the rest they agree with the sects mentioned above [that is, the Tatians, Encratites, and Cathari]. And the Purists use only the canonical scriptures, but these people rely mostly on the so-called Acts of Andrew and Thomas, and have nothing to do with the ecclesiastical canon."
 
At the time when Epiphanius wrote, in the fourth century, they had become an insignificant sect, for in refuting them he says: "They live in a small area, around in Phrygia, Cilicia and Pamphylia. Now what does this mean? Is the church exterminated from one end of the earth to the other? Will 'Their sound is gone out unto all lands, and their words unto the ends of the world,' no longer hold?"
 
St. Basil mentions these heretics in his Epistles. He gives them the name of Apotaktitai (Apotactites) and says that they declared God's creatures defiled (inquinatam). They are also briefly mentioned by St. Augustine and by St. John Damascene. They were condemned in the Code of Theodosius the Great as a branch of the dualist heresy of Manicheans.

References

Notes

Christian denominations established in the 3rd century